The canton of Bar-sur-Aube is an administrative division of the Aube department, northeastern France. Its borders were modified at the French canton reorganisation which came into effect in March 2015. Its seat is in Bar-sur-Aube.

It consists of the following communes:
 
Ailleville
Arconville
Arrentières
Arsonval
Baroville
Bar-sur-Aube
Bayel
Bergères
Bligny
La Chaise
Champignol-lez-Mondeville
Chaumesnil
Colombé-la-Fosse
Colombé-le-Sec
Couvignon
Crespy-le-Neuf
Éclance
Engente
Épothémont
Fontaine
Fravaux
Fresnay
Fuligny
Jaucourt
Juvancourt
Juzanvigny
Lévigny
Lignol-le-Château
Longchamp-sur-Aujon
Maisons-lès-Soulaines
Meurville
Montier-en-l'Isle
Morvilliers
Petit-Mesnil
Proverville
La Rothière
Rouvres-les-Vignes
Saulcy
Soulaines-Dhuys
Spoy
Thil
Thors
Urville
Vernonvilliers
La Ville-aux-Bois
Ville-sous-la-Ferté
Ville-sur-Terre
Voigny

References

Cantons of Aube